Legislative elections were held in El Salvador on 16 March 1997. The result was a narrow victory for the Nationalist Republican Alliance, which won 28 of the 84 seats. Voter turnout was 39.2%.

Results

References

Bibliography
Political Handbook of the world, 1997. New York, 1998. 
Córdova Macías, Ricardo and Andrew J. Stein. 1998. "National and local elections in El Salvador, 1982-1994." Dietz, Henry A. and Gil Shidlo, eds. 1998. Urban elections in democratic Latin America. Wilmington: SR Books. Pages 141-162.
Cruz, José Miguel. 1997. "Tres reflexiones sobre el pasado proceso electoral." Estudios centroamericanos (ECA) 52, 583:442-447 (mayo 1997).
Holiday, David. 1997. "Salvador's guerrilla vote." Nation 264, 14:6 (April 14, 1997).
"Nuevas posibilidades para la transición política." 1997. Estudios centroamericanos (ECA) 52, 581-582 (marzo-abril 1997).
"Resultados electorales." 1997. Estudios centroamericanos (ECA) 52, 581-582:339-358 (marzo-abril 1997).

 

El Salvador
Legislative elections in El Salvador
1997 in El Salvador